Red Returns is an EP by indie rock band Desario, released in April 2016 on Test Pattern Records. The EP follows the band's full-length album Mixer and several years of successful live shows, including opening for Echo & The Bunnymen, The Charlatans UK, Foals, and others of the same sound or genre. The EP preceded the October 28, 2016 release of another EP titled Haunted. In a pre-Red Returns launch interview with The Blog That Celebrates Itself, Desario stated: "There will be another follow-up EP later this year. As a band we have a batch of new songs that we want to record soon. We feel our new songs are pushing us into new areas of songwriting that we haven’t been (pushed into) before."

Track listing
 "Fallen"
 "Capture"
 "Down Among Them"
 "Red Returns"

References

2016 EPs
Desario albums